Aerophile SAS is a French company specialized in building and operating tethered helium balloons. Formed in 1993 the tethered gas balloons operate as tourist attractions around the world. The company has sold more than 60 balloons in 30 countries.

History 
Aerophile was founded in 1993 by two 25-year-old French engineers from the École Polytechnique, Mathieu Gobbi and Jerome Giacomoni.
In 1999, the company launched the large Paris Balloon and improved it in 2008 by adding a lighting system.

In 2000, the company created a mobile tethered balloon approved to carry two people to a height of : the Aero2.

In 2002 they operated the first modern tethered gas ballon on a water-based platform at Neuchâtel.

In 2005 the company installed a large PanoraMagique balloon, operated by a subsidiary Aerotourism, at Disneyland Paris, it was the first 8-point Aero30NG balloon.

In 2007, they set up and opened the first Aerophare in Evry 2 (France), an attraction with an air-filled captive balloon within a  tower. Aerophare is a novel adaptation of a tethered balloon operating in an enclosed tower.

An Aerophile ballon holds the record for carrying 30 passengers in a gas balloon.

The company currently runs six Aero30NG : Paris Balloon, one at Disneyland Paris, one in Walt Disney World Resort, one in the Orange County Great Park, one in the San Diego Zoo Safari Park, and one Aerobar, the latest creation, at Futuroscope.

Subsidiaries
The Aerogroupe company has several subsidiaries :
Aerophile SA, the principal subsidiary (Balloon's manufacture and sale).
Aeroparis to operate the Paris Balloon
Aeromobile to operate the balloon at Irvine
Aerotourism to operate the balloon at Disneyland Paris
Aerophile Orlando to operate the balloon at Walt Disney World Resort

Balloons

The Aero30NG
Its winch system ensures a climb speed of 0.8 m / s and its patented platform optimizes landings. 
This balloon has been installed over the 5 continents : France :Château de Cheverny, Château de Chantilly, Bordeaux, Beaune, Parc de Samara, Paris Balloon and Disneyland Paris, Belgium, Germany, Austria, Switzerland, Italy, Spain, Portugal, United Kingdom, Canada, United States, Tunisia, Turkey, Irak, Lebanon, Dubai, Japan, South Korea, China, Vietnam, Cambodia (Angkor Wat), Thailand, Singapore and Australia. 
Ocean Park Hong Kong, Walt Disney World Resort in Orlando, . This model has also been adapted to allow parachute jumps as part of military training in Yemen.

The Aero2
This is a charged helium balloon of 9 meters in diameter which offers a view to two passengers to around 90m above ground. The moored balloon can be seen at 10 kilomètres around. This balloon has been used as a marketing tool for Danao Tour in 2002 but also by Fortis and throughout France.

The Aerophare
The Aerophare is a balloon operating within a  tower structure.  The structure allows it to operate worse weather than a conventional tethered balloon.

The Aerobar
The first aerial bar of the world. This new concept allows 15 persons to rise up to 120 feet in the sky while enjoying their favorite drink. Visitors are experiencing a triple emotion: the chills of seeing the ground away from their feet, great view while discovering the scenery and the canopy of heaven meeting the earth on 360° and the conviviality with the other passengers that share a drink aboard this aerial bar. The first Aerobar is installed in Futuroscope, second largest theme park in France.

The Little Prince Park:
The first aerial park in the world is in Alsace. The Little Prince Park invites its visitors to a journey on the planet of Antoine de Saint-Exupéry's hero with 23 hectares, 30 attractions, three movie theaters from 60 to 500 seats, two tethered balloons, one Aerobar, flying chairs, two giant labyrinths…and plenty of animals.

External links
Aerophile SA (official site)
Paris balloon
Balloon at Walt Disney World
Balloon at Disneyland Paris
The Little Prince Park

Transport companies of France
Balloon manufacturers
Companies established in 1993